Elections were held in Illinois on Tuesday, November 3, 1942.

Primaries were held April 14, 1942.

Election information
1942 was a midterm election year in the United States.

Turnout
In the primary election 1,963,298 ballots were cast (1,026,644 Democratic and 936,654 Republican).

In the general election 3,049,312 ballots were cast.

Federal elections

United States Senate 

Incumbent Republican Charles W. Brooks was reelected.

United States House 

Illinois had redistricted before this election, and had lost one seat due to reapportionment following the 1950 United States Census. All of Illinois' remaining 26 seats in the United States House of Representatives were up for election in 1942.

Before the election Republicans held 16 seats and Democrats held 11 seats from Illinois. In 1942, Republicans won 19 seats and Democrats won 7 seats.

State elections

Treasurer 

Incumbent first-term Treasurer, Republican Warren Wright, did not seek reelection, instead opting to run for United States Senate. Republican William G. Stratton was elected to succeed him.

Democratic primary
W. D. Forsyth defeated former Illinois Treasurer and Auditor of Public Accounts Edward J. Barrett and two other candidates.

Republican primary
Incumbent congressman William G. Stratton won the Republican nomination.

General election

Superintendent of Public Instruction 

Incumbent second-term Superintendent of Public Instruction John A. Wieland, a Democrat, lost reelection, being unseated by Republican Vernon L. Nickell was elected to succeed him in office.

Democratic primary

Republican primary

General election

State Senate
Seats in the Illinois Senate were up for election in 1942. Republicans retained control of the chamber.

State House of Representatives
Seats in the Illinois House of Representatives were up for election in 1942. Republicans retained control of the chamber.

Trustees of University of Illinois

An election was held for three of nine seats for Trustees of University of Illinois. All three Republican nominees won. With their net increase of two seats in this election, Republicans captured a majority of seats on the University of Illinois Board of Trustees. 

Incumbent Republican Chester R. Davis (elected in a special election two years prior) was reelected. New Republican members Martin G. Luken and Frank H. McKelvey were also elected.

Incumbent Democrats Homer M. Adams and James M. Cleary were not renominated.

Kenney E. Williamson, one of the Democratic Party nominees, had briefly served before, having been appointed in 1940.

Judicial elections

Supreme Court
On June 1, 1942, several districts of the Supreme Court of Illinois had elections.

1st district
Republican Charles H. Thompson unseated Democratic incumbent Paul Farthing.

2nd district
Republican incumbent June C. Smith with reelected.

3rd district
Republican incumbent Walter T. Gunn was reelected, running unopposed.

6th district
Incumbent Democrat Elwyn Riley Shaw was unseated by Republican William J. Fulton.

7th district
Incumbent Democrat Francis S. Wilson was reelected, running unopposed.

Lower courts
Election were held on November 3, 1942 to fill two vacancies on the 16th Judicial Circuit and one vacancy on the 17th Judicial Circuit.

An election was held November 3, 1942 to fill two vacancies on the Superior Court of Cook County.

Ballot measure
One measure was put before voters in 1942.

Illinois Revenue Amendment
The Illinois Revenue Amendment, a proposed amendment to Section 1 of Article IX of the Constitution, failed to meet the threshold for approval.

If approved, this amendment would have enabled the legislature to exempt from certain taxes businesses that sold food for human consumption, allowing the legislature to define the word "food".

In order to be approved, legislatively referred constitutional amendments required approval equal to a majority of voters voting in the entire general election.

Local elections
Local elections were held.

Notes
 This figure (3.13%) represents the increase from the share of the both the result of the 1940 regular election and the combined vote of the 1940 regular and special elections (Republicans won 50.44% of both these election totals in 1940)
 This figure (3.24) represents the decrease from the share of the combined vote of the 1940 regular and special elections. The change from the result of the 1940 regular election alone would be 3.13%.

References

 
Illinois